Surprise! Surprise! A Collection of Mystery Stories with Unexpected Endings is a collection of twelve short stories written by Agatha Christie published by Dodd, Mead and Company in 1965. All of the stories in the collection have appeared in other short story collections. An updated version released in 1982 by Dell Publishing included thirteen short stories with the addition of "The Plymouth Express", from The Under Dog and Other Stories.

Story list

 "Double Sin" – From Double Sin and Other Stories
 "The Arcadian Deer" – From The Labours of Hercules
 "The Adventure of Johnnie Waverly" - From Three Blind Mice and Other Stories
 "Where There’s A Will" – From The Witness for the Prosecution and Other Stories
 "Greenshaw’s Folly" – From Double Sin and Other Stories
 "The Case of the Perfect Maid" – From Three Blind Mice and Other Stories
 "At the Bells and Motley" – From The Mysterious Mr Quin
 "The Case of the Distressed Lady" – From Mr. Parker Pyne, Detective
 "The Third Floor Flat" – From Three Blind Mice and Other Stories
 "The Mystery of the Spanish Shawl" – From The Witness for the Prosecution and Other Stories
 "The Cornish Mystery" – From The Under Dog and Other Stories
 "The Witness for the Prosecution" – From The Witness for the Prosecution and Other Stories

References

1965 short story collections
Short story collections by Agatha Christie
Dodd, Mead & Co. books